The 2011 Waratah Cup was the 9th season of Football NSW's knockout cup competition under the Waratah Cup name. 33 different Associations registered teams into the tournament, including Canberra City FC from the ACT, Wagga Wagga from the Riverina, and three clubs from the Illawarra Region. Entry levels are staggered, with State League Two clubs entering in Round 1, Super League and State League One clubs entering in Round 2, while all NSW Premier League clubs joined in Round 3.

The competition was won by NSW Premier League club Manly United, their first title.

†–After extra time

Preliminary round
The draw was announced on 23 March 2011, and all games were played by 31 March 2011.

 Enfield Rovers fielded two teams in the competition.
 Teams receiving a Bye into the First Round : Caringbah Redbacks, Port Kembla, Wagga United; Dandaloo Football Club, Canberra FC, Picton Rangers, Menai Hawks, Lidcombe Waratah, Belmore Hercules, Bathurst '75, Collaroy Cromer and Enfield Rovers (B)

First round

Second round

Third round

Fourth round

Quarterfinals
The draw for the quarterfinals was announced on 14 June 2011. Of the 8 teams, 5 were from the NSW Premier League, 2 clubs (Hills Brumbies F.C. & Blacktown Spartans) from the NSW Super League, whilst Mounties Wanderers play in the State League One.

Semi-finals

Grand final

See also
 NSW Premier League
 NSW Super League
 NSW State League Division One
 NSW State League Division Two
 Football NSW

References

External links

Waratah Cup
1